The 1958 International cricket season was from April 1958 to August 1958, which consisted only a single international tour.

Season overview

June

New Zealand in England

References

1958 in cricket